Dattaram Dharmaji Hindlekar  (1 January 1909 – 30 March 1949) was a cricketer who kept wicket for India in Test cricket.

Cricket career
Hindlekar toured England in 1936 and 1946 as India's first-choice wicket-keeper. A right-handed batsman, he wore his cap at a "bewildered angle" and "stood with his toes pointing up at an angle of 45 degrees". He opened in the First Test at Lord's in 1936, but chipped a bone in his finger and suffered from blurred vision. This injury and his subsequent exclusion from the next Test led to the famous opening partnership between Vijay Merchant and Mushtaq Ali.

He was an unexpected selection for the 1946 tour. Injuries limited his appearances here as well. In the Manchester Test, he went in last and batted out 13 minutes with Ranga Sohoni to save the match. He is one of only four players (the others being Wilfred Rhodes, Syd Gregory, and Vinoo Mankad) to have batted in every position in the batting order in Test cricket.

Personal life
Hindlekar was born in Bombay, the son of a farmer from Ratnagiri in Maharashtra. He worked in the Bombay Port Trust for a salary of Rs.80 a month. His means were so limited that he could not afford to buy a pair of gloves, and used to visit Khershed Meherhomji and borrow his. He was the uncle of Vijay Manjrekar and great-uncle of Sanjay Manjrekar.

Hindlekar died at the age of 40 for want of proper treatment. It was only at a very late stage of his illness that he was moved to the Arthur Road Hospital in Bombay. He was survived by his wife and their seven children. After his death the BCCI and Bombay Cricket Association issued appeals for contributions to help his family, but there was little response. The Bombay Port Trust then organised a cabaret dance on 6 August 1949 which raised a little over Rs.7,000. Almost every major Indian cricketer of the time attended the dance.

References

External links
 

Indian cricketers
India Test cricketers
Mumbai cricketers
Hindus cricketers
Rajasthan cricketers
West Zone cricketers
1909 births
1949 deaths
Cricketers from Mumbai
People from Ratnagiri
Wicket-keepers